Sfântu Gheorghe is a commune located in Ialomița County, Muntenia, Romania. It is composed of three villages: Butoiu, Malu and Sfântu Gheorghe.

References

Communes in Ialomița County
Localities in Muntenia